Rosebank College is an independent Roman Catholic comprehensive co-educational secondary day school in the Benedictine tradition, located in Five Dock, an inner-western suburb of Sydney, New South Wales, Australia.

History
Founded in 1867 by Archbishop John Bede Polding and the Sisters of the Good Samaritan, Rosebank College is one of the earliest schools in New South Wales and is among the oldest in Australia. The college currently caters for 1400 students. Young men were welcomed into the Year 7 for the first time in 2009 and full co-education was achieved in 2012. 

In 2017, the college celebrated its 150th anniversary.

Campus
Rosebank's facilities are housed in eight buildings. In 2014 three new buildings, Ottilien Hall, Montserrat Hall and Jamberoo Hall were opened. The buildings provide the college basketball courts, the Benedict Auditorium, an undercroft play area, the cafeteria and learning spaces including science labs, music, dance and drama rooms. The Scholastica Research and Study Centre, IT support desk, hospitality kitchens and art rooms are located in Subiaco Hall. As of 2018, the college finished a new staff and administration building which includes 12 new classrooms, Downside Hall. In 2022 Manquehue Hall was opened, located on the corner of Parramatta and Harris Road, with a focus on collaborative and flexible learning. 

The Rosebank College campus is notable for the high brick fence surrounding its perimeter and the extensive bank of roses that has existed on the property since the late 1840s, the historic chapel and private cemetery gardens where the early Good Samaritan sisters are buried.

In 2008, the college and its grounds were heritage-listed under the Local Government Act for historical and cultural significance; "Rosebank College is a rare example of a nineteenth-century estate that survives with most of its land in the Canada Bay Council area. The College has considerable significance for the 1850s chapel that, despite some alterations, retains the qualities of a Victorian Gothic chapel and for the 1876 school building that is a fine example of the work of George Allen Mansfield. The grounds of Rosebank College retain extensive lawns and plantings, many established in the early to mid-twentieth century, that are part of the continuum of use of the site as a Catholic convent and college. The high brick wall around the perimeter is notable in the surrounding streetscape and adds to the amenity of the grounds." 

The Sisters of the Good Samaritan Congregational Offices were situated at the college until 2017 when they moved to Glebe.

House System
The ten houses are named after men and women in the history of the college. The college originally had 6 houses (Brady, Cassidy, Caulfield, Delaney, Dwyer and McLaughlin). This increased to 7 with the introduction of Vaughan in 2013. O'Connor was added to the college house system in 2016. The latest additions, Adamson and Hayes, were introduced in 2019.

Notable alumnae
Jennifer Anne Alexander - chief executive officer of the Australian Institute of Management, New South Wales and the Australian Capital Territory; Chairman of Gondwana Voices (also attended St Scholastica's College)
 Jan Cameron, Olympic swimmer and coach
 Theresa (Cissie) McLaughlin - founding sister of the Society of Our Lady's Nurses for the Poor; First Superior and later Mother General of the Order
Melina Marchetta, author of several young adult novels including Looking for Alibrandi
Bruno Schiavi, Australian fashion designer and businessman
Fiona Martin, former Australian Liberal Party politician

See also 

 List of Catholic schools in New South Wales
 Catholic education in Australia

References

External links
 Rosebank College website
 Sisters of the Good Samaritan

Educational institutions established in 1867
Catholic secondary schools in Sydney
Inner West
George Allen Mansfield buildings
1867 establishments in Australia